Michele Russo (30 January 1945 – 30 March 2019) was an Italian Roman Catholic bishop.

Biography 
Russo was born in Italy and was ordained to the priesthood in 1970. He served as bishop of the Roman Catholic Diocese of Doba, Chad, from 1989 to 2014.

Notes

1945 births
2019 deaths
20th-century Roman Catholic bishops in Chad
Italian Roman Catholic bishops in Africa
21st-century Roman Catholic bishops in Chad
Roman Catholic bishops of Doba